Michelle Lisa Dunkley (born 26 January 1978) is an English female former athlete who competed in the high jump. She has a personal best performance of 1.94 metres.

Athletics career
Dunkley achieved 8th place at the 1996 World Junior Championships in Sydney, Australia. She represented England in the high jump metres event just missed a bronze medal by finishing 4th, at the 1998 Commonwealth Games in Kuala Lumpur, Malaysia.

She has won two British indoor titles in 1996 and 1999 and was the sole British junior indoor record holder for 18 years until her mark of 1.89 metres was matched by Morgan Lake in 2015.She began her career at Kettering Town Harriers where she trained with Andrew Cokeley a track and middle distance athlete and County Champion at 800m and 1500m who almost got his chance to represent England but a foot injury ended his career.

References

1978 births
Living people
British female high jumpers
Athletes (track and field) at the 1998 Commonwealth Games
Commonwealth Games competitors for England